Tricheilostoma broadleyi is a species of snake in the family Leptotyphlopidae. The species is endemic to Ivory Coast.

Etymology
The specific name, broadleyi, is in honor of herpetologist Donald G. Broadley.

Geographic range

Habitat
The preferred habitats of T. broadleyi are forest and savanna.

Description
T. broadleyi is a small species.

Reproduction
T. broadleyi is oviparous.

References

Further reading
Adalsteinsson SA, Branch WR, Trape S, Vitt LJ, Hedges SB (2009). "Molecular phylogeny, classification, and biogeography of snakes of the Family Leptotyphlopidae (Reptilia, Squamata)". Zootaxa 2244: 1-50. (Guinea broadleyi, new combination).
Hedges SB (2011). "The type species of the threadsnake genus Tricheilostoma Jan revisited (Squamata, Leptotyphlopidae)". Zootaxa 3027: 63–64. (Tricheilostoma broadleyi, new combination).
Wallach V, Hahn DE (1997). "Leptotyphlops broadleyi, a new species of worm snake from Côte d'Ivoire (Serpentes: Leptotyphlopidae)". African Journal of Herpetology 46 (2): 103–109.

Endemic fauna of Ivory Coast
Tricheilostoma
Reptiles described in 1997